Members of the New South Wales Legislative Council who served from 1904 to 1907 were appointed for life by the Governor on the advice of the Premier. This list includes members between the state election on 6 August 1904 and the state election on 10 September 1907. The President was Sir Francis Suttor.

Non-Labor party affiliations at this time were fluid, and especially in the Legislative Council regarded more as loose labels than genuine parties.

See also
Carruthers ministry

Notes

References

 

Members of New South Wales parliaments by term
20th-century Australian politicians